Robert Bowers (born 19 August 1959), better known as Barney Bowers, is a former professional footballer who played as a midfielder for Derby County, Cliftonville, Ards and Glentoran.

He has won every medal possible in the Irish League during his career for Glentoran, where he played from 1981 to 1995. He is also in the club's top 10 players in terms of appearances, ranking 7th, and is one of 27 players to score over 100 goals for the club.

Early years and family
Robert Bowers is the second child of George "Geordie" Bowers (1933–2012) and Christina Bowers (1938–1987). He was born on the 19 August 1959. He has three sisters and three brothers. He grew up in east Belfast. He was given the nickname Barney by friends and family, which he became better known by.

Career

Early career (1978–1981)
As an 18-year-old Barney was a part of the Glentoran scouting network, only to be signed by Cliftonville. Derby manager Tommy Docherty signed him for £25,000.

Despite an offer from Swindon Town, Barney opted to return to Belfast, and join his boyhood favourites at The Oval in August 1981.

Glentoran (1981–1995)
Bowers made his debut in a match against Dundalk at home in August 1981, which finished 0-0.

Despite missing so much Barney still amassed over 500 appearances for Glentoran after joining from Derby County in August 1981, but for those two broken legs and a fractured cheekbone Barney would have been the record holder for Glentoran appearances.

In 1992 he led Glentoran to the League title, the only medal he had previously not won in the Irish League, having missed out on a medal during their double year, when out with a broken leg.

As of 2019, he is 7th place on the list of most appearances for Glentoran with 524. This also means he is a member of the 250 Club. He is also on the list for top goal scorers with 108.

Ards (1995–1997)
Bowers scored Ards only goal in their 1997 UEFA Intertoto Cup campaign.

He is the record holder for European appearances for a Glentoran player & Irish League player, with a number of appearances for Ards in Europe towards the end of his career.

Retirement from league football
Since retiring from league football, Bowers has still appeared in charity games. In July 2008, the Glentoran Legends team was set up, in which Barney has been a part of since the first match.

Personal life
Bowers lives in Belfast, Northern Ireland with his wife. He has two sons.

Career statistics

Honours
Glentoran
 IFA Premiership: 1991–92
 Irish Cup: 1989–90
 Irish League Cup: 1988–89, 1990–91
 County Antrim Shield: 1984–85, 1986–87
 Irish FA Charity Shield: 1992–93 (shared with Glenavon)
 Gold Cup: 1982–83, 1986–87, 1991–92, 1994–95
 Ulster Cup: 1981–82, 1982–83, 1983–84, 1988–89, 1989–90
 Floodlit Cup: 1989–90

Notes

1959 births
Living people
Ards F.C. players
Cliftonville F.C. players
Derby County F.C. players
Glentoran F.C. players
NIFL Premiership players
Association footballers from Northern Ireland
Expatriate footballers in England
Association footballers from Belfast
Irish League representative players
Association football midfielders